Nettanigemudnoor  is a village in the southern state of Karnataka, India. It is located in the Puttur taluk of Dakshina Kannada district.

Demographics
 India census, Nettanigemudnoor had a population of 8226 with 4082 males and 4144 females.

See also
 Dakshina Kannada
 Districts of Karnataka

References

External links
 http://dk.nic.in/

Villages in Dakshina Kannada district